Metamorphosis I is a woodcut print by the Dutch artist M. C. Escher which was first printed in May, 1937. This piece measures  and is printed on two sheets.

The concept of this work is to morph one image into a tessellated pattern, then gradually to alter the outlines of that pattern to become an altogether different image. From left to right, the image begins with a depiction of the coastal Italian town of Atrani (see Atrani, Coast of Amalfi). The outlines of the architecture then morph to a pattern of three-dimensional blocks. These blocks then slowly become a tessellated pattern of cartoon-like figures in oriental attire.

See also
Metamorphosis II
Metamorphosis III
Regular Division of the Plane

Sources
Locher, J. L. (2000). The Magic of M. C. Escher. Harry N. Abrams, Inc. .

Works by M. C. Escher
1937 paintings
Woodcuts